These are the results of the diving competition at the 1973 World Aquatics Championships, which took place in Belgrade.

Medal table

Medal summary

Men

Women

 
1973 World Aquatics Championships
Diving at the World Aquatics Championships